Xiaowanshan Dao, or Xiaowanshan Island, is an island in the southwest Wanshan Archipelago, offshore of Guangdong in China. Xiaowanshan Dao is located in the west of Dawanshan Dao. The two islands are separated by about 1000 m. Xiaowanshan Dao has an area of about 4.35 km2.

Geography
Xiaowanshan Dao has more sufficient freshwater than Dawanshan Dao. There are several small rivers on the island with water all year round. Nanpingmen is located just offshore of Xiaowanshan Dao and can be served as a waterway for the harbor which is being planned.

See also

 Wanshan Archipelago Campaign

References 

Wanshan Archipelago
Uninhabited islands of China
Islands of Guangdong
Islands of China